Schauspielschule Bochum is the informal name of a drama school in Bochum, North Rhine-Westphalia, Germany, which is now part of the Folkwang University of the Arts. It has a long tradition, being founded in 1939 as Westfälische Schauspielschule Bochum.

History
The drama school was founded in 1939 as the Westfälische Schauspielschule Bochum by Saladin Schmitt, then intendant of the Schauspielhaus Bochum. It was originally a municipal school. Up to the 1970s, the intendant was also the artistic director of the drama school. In 2000, it became a state school of North Rhine-Westphalia and a Bochum location of the Folkwang-Hochschule.

In 2014, the main location of the drama school changed to the new Folkwang-Theaterzentrum (Folkwang theatre centre) in Wiemelhausen, close to the centre of Bochum. It has two stages, the Großer Saal and the Black Box (in the former Thürmer-Saal), as well as classrooms and rehearsal and meeting rooms. Now part of the Folkwang University of the Arts, the drama school is a member of the Ständige Konferenz Schauspielausbildung.

Studies

The curriculum is planned for eight semesters, four of them for fundamental training of voice, speech, and body movement.
Students take part in a production of Schauspielhaus Bochum during their third year in order to achieve insight into theatre practise. During the last semester, students are offered practical work at various German-speaking theatres. They also receive courses in acting in front of a camera, in collaboration with the broadcaster Westdeutscher Rundfunk Köln. The second-year students give a performance in the summer at Haus Weitmar. Traditionally, a play or scenes by Shakespeare are presented.

Alumni

 Dietmar Bär
 Henning Baum
 
 Natja Brunckhorst
 Lambert Hamel
 Fabian Hinrichs
 Rolf Kanies
 Michael Kessler
 Ignaz Kirchner
 Peter Lohmeyer
 Krystian Martinek
 Tessa Mittelstaedt
 Richy Müller
 Uwe Ochsenknecht
 Nina Petri
 Andreas Pietschmann
 Christian Quadflieg
 Roland Reber
 Christian Redl
 Walter Renneisen
 Ralf Richter
 Esther Schweins
 Martin Wuttke
 Manfred Zapatka
 Daniela Ziegler

References

External links
 
 Aktuell Bochum, location of Folkwang University

Bochum, Schauspielschule
1939 establishments in Germany